Florence Township is located in Stephenson County, Illinois. As of the 2010 census, its population was 1,293 and it contained 541 housing units. The unincorporated community of Florence is located in the township.

Geography
Florence is Township 26 North, Range 7 East of the Fourth Principal Meridian.

Demographics

See also
James Bruce Round Barn

References

External links
City-data.com
Stephenson County Official Site

Townships in Stephenson County, Illinois
Townships in Illinois